Turck is a unincorporated community in Cherokee County, Kansas, United States.  Its elevation is 932 feet.

History
Turck had a post office from 1889 until 1891.

References

Further reading

External links
 USD 493, local school district
 Cherokee County maps: Current, Historic, KDOT

Unincorporated communities in Kansas
Unincorporated communities in Cherokee County, Kansas